SV Victory Boys is a Curaçao football team based in Willemstad, playing in the First Division Curaçao League.

Achievements
Second Division Curacao: 2
1976, 1985
coca cola tournament: 1
2014

Performance in CONCACAF competition
CFU Club Championship: 1 appearance
CFU Club Championship 2005 – Quarter-Finals – Lost against  Northern United All Stars 2 – 1 in the global result.

Current squad 2016–17

References

Victory Boys
Victory Boys
Association football clubs established in 1952
1952 establishments in Curaçao